Shek Uk Shan is the highest mountain (481 metres) in Sai Kung Peninsula, Hong Kong. A signal (radio) station is located by the top of the peak.

See also

List of mountains, peaks and hills in Hong Kong
Sai Kung Peninsula
Sharp Peak

References

Mountains, peaks and hills of Hong Kong
Sai Kung North